Arbeitsfront der Volksdeutschen in der Slowakei ('Labour Front of the Volksdeutsche in Slovakia', abbreviated A.d.V.) was an organization of ethnic German workers in World War II Slovakia. A.d.V. was modelled after the German Labour Front (D.A.F.) in the German Reich. A.d.V. was formed on November 26, 1940, replacing the previous German Trade Unions in Slovakia. A.d.V. leaders were trained at the D.A.F. training centre in Schwechat.

As of 1943 A.d.V. claimed to have over 33,000 members.

References

Trade unions in Slovakia
1940 establishments in Slovakia
German Party (Slovakia)
Trade unions established in 1940
Fascist trade unions